HSwMS Loke was the fourth, and last, ship of the s built for the Royal Swedish Navy in the late-1860s. Completed in 1871 she only made seven short cruises before she was permanently placed in reserve in late 1880. Funds were requested to reconstruct her in line with the other monitors, but were denied. She was listed for sale in 1908, but nothing is known of her fate.

Design and description
The John Ericsson-class ironclads were designed to meet the need of the Swedish and Norwegian Navies for small, shallow-draft armored ships capable of defending their coastal waters. John Ericsson, designer and builder of the Monitor, had been born in Sweden, although he had become an American citizen in 1848, and offered to share his design with the Swedes. In response they sent Lieutenant John Christian d'Ailly to the United States to study monitor design and construction under Ericsson. D'Ailly arrived in July 1862 and toured rolling mills, gun foundries, and visited several different ironclads under construction. He returned to Sweden in 1863 having completed the drawings of a Monitor-type ship under Ericsson's supervision.

Loke, the last-built ship in the class, was somewhat larger than her half-sisters. The ship drew  and displaced  fully loaded. The ship was divided into nine main compartments by eight watertight bulkheads. Over time a flying bridge and, later, a full superstructure, was added to each ship between the gun turret and the funnel. Initially their crew numbered 80 officers and men, but this increased to 104 as the ships were modified with additional weapons.

Propulsion
The John Ericsson-class ships had one twin-cylinder vibrating lever steam engines, designed by Ericsson himself, driving a single four-bladed,  propeller. The ships carried  of coal, enough for six day's steaming.

Armament
Loke was equipped with two  M/69 rifled breech loaders, derived from a French design. An improved version was developed in the 1870s and Loke was fitted with them in 1890.

In 1877 the monitor received a pair of 10-barreled  M/75 machine guns designed by Helge Palmcrantz. These guns were replaced during the 1880s by the 4-barreled  M/77 Nordenfeldt gun, which was an enlarged version of Palmcrantz's original design.

Armor
The inside of the turret was lined with mattresses to catch splinters. The conning tower was positioned on top of the turret and its sides were ten layers thick. The funnel was protected by six layers of armor with a total thickness of  up to half its height.

Service
Loke had her keel laid down in March 1867 and was launched on 4 September 1869. She was commissioned on 22 October 1871 at the cost of 1,200,428 Swedish krona. The delay in construction may have been due to manufacturing difficulties by the British supplier of her armor plate. Generally the monitors were kept in reserve for most of the year; only being commissioned for two to four months during the summer and fall. Loke made only seven cruises, the last in late 1880, and was not commissioned afterwards. Funds were requested to rebuild her in 1903 and 1908, but they were refused. She was decommissioned on 21 August 1908 and advertised for sale. The details of her fate are unknown, but presumably she was sold and scrapped.

Footnotes

References
 
 
 

John Ericsson-class monitors of the Swedish Navy
1869 ships
Ships built in Norrköping